Live Bait Vol. 01 - Summer 2010 Leg 1 is a live download by jam band Phish. This download features highlights from their summer tour, including Backwards Down the Number Line and Kill Devil Falls. The album was released shortly after Phish's 2010 Summer Tour was completed. It was available for free on the official Phish website for a short time. It is now available for purchase from Phish's LivePhish website.

Track listing

References

External links 
 Phish.com - Official Site
 LivePhish.com - Live Bait Vol. 01

Phish live albums
2010 live albums
LivePhish.com Downloads